Khon San is the northernmost district (amphoe) of Chaiyaphum province, northeastern Thailand.

History
In the early of the Rattanakosin era at the end of the 18th century, Mr. Phumi led the people from Mueang Nakhon Thai district, a subordinate of Phitsanulok, to establish their new town in this area. Mr. Phumi who was the town leader sent tribute to King Rama I. The king promoted him to be Muen Aram Kamhaeng and Luang Phichit Songkhram later, the first governor position of Khon San.

As the way from Bangkok to Khon San was so long, government officers had to carry royal command documents (Thai: San สาร) by a wooden bar on their shoulders. This method of carrying is called khon (คอน) in Thai.

In the reign of King Rama V, the town was downgraded to be a subdistrict of Phu Khiao district. On 16 August 1958 it was again separated from Phu Khiao and became a minor district (king amphoe), then containing the three tambons Khon San, Nun Khun, and Thung Phra. It was upgraded to a full district on 10 December 1959.

Geography

Neighboring districts are (from the north clockwise): Phu Pha Man and Chum Phae of Khon Kaen province; Phu Khiao, Kaset Sombun, and Nong Bua Daeng of Chaiyaphum Province; Mueang Phetchabun, Lom Sak, and Nam Nao of Phetchabun province.

In the south of the district is the Phu Khiao Wildlife Sanctuary. The Chulabhorn Dam creates an artificial lake on the Nam Phrom River, covering about 12 km2. The 700 metre long, 70 metre high dam was finished in 1973 and is used for generating hydroelectric power.

Administration

Central administration 
Khon San is divided into eight subdistricts (tambons), which are further subdivided into 85 administrative villages (mubans).

Local administration 
There are three subdistrict municipalities (thesaban tambons) in the district:
 Khon San consisting of parts of subdistricts Khon San and Dong Bang.
 Huai Yang consisting of subdistrict Huai Yang.
 Thung Luilai consisting of subdistrict Thung Luilai.

There are six subdistrict administrative organizations (SAO) in the district:
 Khon San consisting of parts of subdistrict Khon San.
 Thung Phra consisting of subdistrict Thung Phra.
 Non Khun consisting of subdistrict Non Khun.
 Dong Bang consisting of parts of subdistrict Dong Bang.
 Thung Na Lao consisting of subdistrict Thung Na Lao.
 Dong Klang consisting of subdistrict Dong Klang.

References

External links
amphoe.com

Districts of Chaiyaphum province